Yellow-spotted tree frog is a common name for several frogs and may refer to:

Leptopelis flavomaculatus, native to eastern and southern Africa
Litoria castanea, native to southeastern Australia
Boana curupi, native to South America